Wat'aqucha (Quechua wat'a island, qucha lake, "island lake", Hispanicized spelling Huatajocha) is a lake in the Ayacucho Region in Peru. It is located in the Lucanas Province, Chipao District. Wat'aqucha lies southeast of Suyt'uqucha and Chawpiqucha.

References

Lakes of Peru
Lakes of Ayacucho Region